Daniel Mangena is an author, motivational speaker and radio host. He is best known for his book Money Game.

Early life
Mangena was born in London, England. He was diagnosed with Asperger's in his twenties and spent years struggling with it.

Books
 The Dreamer's Manifesto, 2018 
 Stepping Beyond Intention, 2019 
 Money Game, 2021

External links

References

British writers
English motivational speakers
Life coaches
Living people
Year of birth missing (living people)